The Liga Nacional de Hockey Hielo Femenino (National Women's Ice Hockey League) is the national women's ice hockey league in Spain. The league was founded in 2008 and is overseen by the Spanish Ice Sports Federation (RFEDH). SAD Majadahonda is the league’s most successful team, having won six championships over the eleven seasons the league has been operational. The Valladolid Panteras are the second most successful team in the league, having won four championships.

Champions
 2009 - Valladolid Panteras
 2010 - Valladolid Panteras
 2011 - Valladolid Panteras
 2012 - Valladolid Panteras
 2013 - SAD Majadahonda
 2014 - SAD Majadahonda
 2015 - SAD Majadahonda
 2016 - FC Barcelona
 2017 - SAD Majadahonda
 2018 - SAD Majadahonda
 2019 - SAD Majadahonda
 2020 - SAD Majadahonda
 2021 - SAD Majadahonda
 2022 - CHH Txuri Urdin
 2023 - CH Jaca

Spanish Cup
The Spanish Cup of Women's Ice Hockey pits the league winner and runner-up against each other.
 2009 - SAD Majadahonda 
 2010 - SAD Majadahonda 
 2011 - Valladolid Panteras 
 2012 - SAD Majadahonda
 2013 - SAD Majadahonda
 2014 - SAD Majadahonda
 2015 - SAD Majadahonda
 2016 - FC Barcelona
 2017 - SAD Majadahonda
 2018 - SAD Majadahonda
 2019 - SAD Majadahonda
 2020 - Cancelada por Covid19 
 2021 - SAD Majadahonda
 2022 - CHH Txuri Urdin

References

External links
Rfedh.es

 

Ice hockey in Spain
Spain
Women's sports leagues in Spain